Idhaya Thirudan is a 2006 Indian Tamil-language romantic action film written and directed by Saran. The film stars Jayam Ravi and Kamna Jethmalani, while Prakash Raj, Vani Viswanath, Santhanam, Kalpana, and Nassar play supporting roles. It was Jayam Ravi’s fifth film but was labelled his worst of the five. The soundtrack  was composed by Bharadwaj. It was released on 10 February 2006. It was Kamna Jethmalani's debut movie in Tamil film industry.

Plot
Deepika (Kamna Jethmalani) cannot bear with the control that her mother Sudha Rani (Vani Viswanath) imposes on her life. In order to make her mother angry, she uploads explicit pictures of herself and emails them to a fictitious name, "T. Mahesh". However, there seems to exist a T. Mahesh (Jayam Ravi), who is a catering student. The more Deepika and Mahesh run into each other, and he starts following her wherever she goes. Mayilravanan (Prakash Raj) is a policeman who wants to marry Deepika. In hopes of creating a distance between Deepika and Mahesh, Mayilravanan seeks a relationship with Sudha Rani. The relationship between Deepika and Mahesh grows into love as they both try to separate Mayilravanan and Sudha Rani in hopes of setting life to how it originally was.

Cast

Production
The film has been shot at locations in Chennai, Mumbai, Bangalore, Austria and Italy. The songs have been picturised at some exotic locations in Germany, Austria, Mumbai, Alapuzha in Kerala, and at the Guindy Race Course in Chennai.

Soundtrack
The soundtrack consist of 6 songs composed by Bharadwaj.The Lyrics of the songs were written by Vairamuthu.

Critical reception
Thiraipadam wrote:" It has the Saran stamp both in the positives like a fast-paced screenplay and a plot twist and the negatives like a weak climax but the overload of coincidences and contrivances is the movie's biggest problem".
Hindu wrote:"The story meanders in rudderless fashion before suddenly waking up to an action-packed climax".
IndiaGlitz wrote:" Though certainly not in the category of Amarkalam or Vasoolraja, Saran's Idhaya Thirudan is a sure attraction for youths".

Box office
This film received negative reviews from the audience as it was later considered a flop.

References

External links

2006 films
2000s Tamil-language films
Films directed by Saran
Films scored by Bharadwaj (composer)
Films shot in Turkey
Films shot in Germany
Films shot in Austria
Films shot in Italy
Films with screenplays by Crazy Mohan
2000s masala films
Indian romantic action films
2000s romantic action films